Ambatolampy is a city (commune urbaine) in the Vakinankaratra Region, situated in the Central Highlands of Madagascar. It had a population of about 28,500 in 2013.

It is the administrative capital of the district of the same name, and is situated on Route nationale No. 7 which runs from Antananarivo to Toliara. Ambatolampy is a railway station on the Antananarivo - Antsirabe line. It is situated at 70 km South from the capital Antananarivo.

A species of gecko, Lygodactylus tolampyae, may be named after Ambatolampy.

Economy
Ambatolampy is known for its Aluminium founderies. Most of aluminium kitchen utensils in Madagascar are produced in this town.
The founderies also work with copper and bronze.

Museums
The Butterfly museum (Musée des Papillons) is in Ambatolampy. The museum exhibits 6,000 species of insects and butterflies.

References

Cities in Madagascar
Populated places in Vakinankaratra